Ur-Baba or Ur-Bau (  or , servant of the goddess Bau) was ensi of Lagash from 2093 BC – 2080 BC (short chronology) or 2157 BC – 2144 BC (middle chronology), roughly contemporaneous with the last king of Akkad, Shu-turul. In one of his inscriptions, he refers to himself as a child of the god Ninagal.

According to inscriptions of Ur-Baba, during his reign Lagash enjoyed prosperity and independence from the Akkadians. His daughter Ninalla married Gudea, who succeeded him as ensi.

References

22nd-century BC Sumerian kings
Kings of Lagash